Kushk-e Nar (also Romanized as Kūshk-e Nār and Kūshk Nār; also known as Koosh Kenar, Koshkonār, Kūshkonār, Kūshk Sār, and Kush Kunār) is a city in Kushk-e Nar Rural District, Kushk-e Nar District, Parsian County, Hormozgan Province, Iran. At the 2006 census, its population was 2,601, in 539 families.

References 

Populated places in Parsian County
Cities in Hormozgan Province